The  is one of nine active divisions of the Japan Ground Self-Defense Force. The division is subordinated to the North Eastern Army and is headquartered in Aomori. Its responsibility is the defense of Akita, Aomori and Iwate prefectures.

The division was raised on 15 August 1962.

Organization 

 9th Division, in Aomori
 9th Division HQ, in Aomori
 5th Infantry Regiment note 1, in Aomori
 21st Infantry Regiment, in Akita
 39th Infantry Regiment, in Hirosaki
 9th Tank Battalion, in Iwate, with two Companies of Type 74 main battle tanks
 9th Reconnaissance Unit, in Hirosaki, with Type 87 armored reconnaissance vehicles
 9th Anti-Aircraft Artillery Battalion, in Takizawa, with one Type 81 and one Type 93 Surface-to-air missile battery
 9th Engineer Battalion (Combat), in Hachinohe
 9th Signal Battalion, in Aomori
 9th Aviation Squadron, in Hachinohe, flying UH-1J and OH-6D helicopters
 9th NBC Protection Company, in Aomori
 9th Logistic Support Regiment, in Hachinohe
 1st Maintenance Battalion
 2nd Maintenance Battalion (Direct Support)
 Supply Company
 Medical Company
 Transport Company

note 1: Infantry Regiments have only battalion strength.

External links
 Homepage 9th Division (Japanese)

Japan Ground Self-Defense Force Division
Military units and formations established in 1962